The Fairfield Township School District serves students in pre-kindergarten through eighth grade from Fairfield Township, in Cumberland County, New Jersey, United States. The school has a Bridgeton mailing address.

As of the 2019–20 school year, the district, comprised of one school, had an enrollment of 554 students and 54.0 classroom teachers (on an FTE basis), for a student–teacher ratio of 10.3:1.

The district is classified by the New Jersey Department of Education as being in District Factor Group "A", the lowest of eight groupings. District Factor Groups organize districts statewide to allow comparison by common socioeconomic characteristics of the local districts. From lowest socioeconomic status to highest, the categories are A, B, CD, DE, FG, GH, I and J.

Public school students in ninth through twelfth grades attend Cumberland Regional High School, which also serves students from Deerfield Township, Greenwich Township, Hopewell Township, Shiloh Borough, Stow Creek Township and Upper Deerfield Township. As of the 2019–20 school year, the high school had an enrollment of 998 students and 78.3 classroom teachers (on an FTE basis), for a student–teacher ratio of 12.7:1.

Schools
Fairfield Township School opened in September 2006, replacing two antiquated facilities and consolidated all grades into one building located at 375 Gouldtown-Woodruff Road in the Gouldtown section of the township. The school had an enrollment of 552 students in pre-kindergarten through eighth grade as of the 2019-20 school year.
Dr. Ja’Shanna Jones–Booker, Principal

Administration
Core members of the district's administration are:
Dr. Ja'Shanna Jones-Booker, Superintendent
Dr. Sean McCarron, Business Administrator / Board Secretary

Board of education
The district's board of education is comprised of nine members who set policy and oversee the fiscal and educational operation of the district through its administration. As a Type II school district, the board's trustees are elected directly by voters to serve three-year terms of office on a staggered basis, with three seats up for election each year held (since 2012) as part of the November general election. The board appoints a superintendent to oversee the district's day-to-day operations and a business administrator to supervise the business functions of the district.

References

External links
Fairfield Township School District

School Data for the Fairfield Township School District, National Center for Education Statistics
Cumberland Regional High School

Fairfield Township, Cumberland County, New Jersey
New Jersey District Factor Group A
School districts in Cumberland County, New Jersey